The 2022 Judo Grand Slam Düsseldorf was to be held in Düsseldorf, Germany, from 4 to 6 June 2022.

The German Judo Federation announced on 15 February that the event would be cancelled due to financial difficulties resulting from Covid-19 restrictions.

References

External links
 

2022 IJF World Tour
2022 Judo Grand Slam
Judo
Judo
Judo